Impetuoso (D 558) is the lead ship of the Impetuoso-class destroyer of the Italian Navy.

Development  
Impetuoso-class were ordered by the Italian Navy in February 1950. They are based on Commandante hull design. This class holds similar characteristics to the Gearing-class destroyers.

Construction and career 
She is laid down on 7 May 1952 and launched on 16 September 1956 by Cantiere navale di Riva Trigoso. Commissioned on 25 January 1958 with the hull number D 558 and decommissioned in 1983.

Gallery

References

External links
 Destroyer Impetuoso Marina Militare website

Impetuoso-class destroyers
1956 ships